Titus Vibe-Müller (17 October 1912 – 19 May 1986) was a Norwegian film director.

He was born in Kristiania. Among his films are To liv from 1946 (jointly with Finn Bø), Kampen om tungtvannet from 1948, which he co-directed with Jean Dréville, a French/Norwegian co-production documenting the Norwegian heavy water sabotage during the Second World War, Marianne på sykehus from 1950, and Flukten fra Dakar from 1951. He made a number of television documentaries with zoologist Per Høst.

He was awarded the ENIC Medal at the 1948 Venice Film Festival.

References

External links 

1912 births
1986 deaths
Film people from Oslo
Norwegian film directors